Martin Stadtfeld (born 19 November 1980 in Gackenbach) is a German pianist.

Stadtfeld gave his first concert at age 9, and at age 14 enrolled at the Frankfurt University of Music and Performing Arts in Frankfurt under the tutelage of Russian-American professor Lev Natochenny. He completed his Abitur in 2000 at Landesmusikgymnasium Rhineland-Palatinate.

Stadtfeld is currently under contract with Sony Classical.

Awards
2002: First prize at the 11th International Bach Competition of Leipzig

References

External links 
 

German classical pianists
Male classical pianists
Living people
1980 births
21st-century classical pianists
21st-century male musicians